Matanzas is a municipality in the Peravia province of the Dominican Republic. It was recently created as a municipality on June 1, 2014

References 

Populated places in Peravia Province
Municipalities of the Dominican Republic